The Goodyear Farms Historic Cemetery is the official name given to a historic cemetery located at 3900 N Santa Fe Trail in the city of Avondale, Arizona. In the past the cemetery was known as the "Pioneer Cemetery" and also as the "Litchfield Cemetery". It is the final resting place of many Mexican migrants and Native-Americans who worked in the Goodyear Farms and the Wigwam Resort in Litchfield Park. The majority of the unmarked graves are of those who perished in the 1918 Spanish Influenza pandemic which spread throughout the entire globe. The Pioneers' Cemetery Association (PCA) defines an "historic cemetery" as one which has been in existence for more than fifty years.

History
Paul Weeks Litchfield was an American industrialist, born in Boston, Massachusetts, who in 1900 became the superintendent of the Goodyear Tire & Rubber Company plant in Akron, Ohio. During World War I, the demand for cotton was in an all-time high in the United States. The United States Department of Agriculture suggested that cotton could be grown in the area surrounding Phoenix, Arizona. Litchfield went to Phoenix, but was unsuccessful. He did become interested in the Salt River Valley area and convinced the Goodyear to establish the Southwest Cotton Company in Phoenix. Litchfield was named president and he purchased  in the general Salt River Valley area which included  around the present site of Litchfield Park, then known as Litchfield Ranch.

Two thousand men and women, mostly Mexican migrants and Native Americans were recruited by the Southwest Cotton Company. They transformed the desert area into agricultural fields which they worked and cultivated thousands of acres of cotton fields.

Cemetery

In 1917, Litchfield established the cemetery for the employees of the Goodyear Farms and the Wigwam Resort.The cemetery was first called the "Pioneer Cemetery" and later changed to "Litchfield Cemetery". In 1918, the labor camps in Arizona were not exempt from Spanish influenza pandemic. Many of the workers of the Litchfield Ranch were affected and died. It is believed that there are approximately 1700 graves in the cemetery. Most of the graves related to those who died from the epidemic are unmarked. Eventually, other workers and their families used this cemetery.

Former Avondale City Councilman Amado B. Sernas (1908–1994) is buried there. Sernas Plaza in Avondale is named after him. The mural was painted by Cuban artist Victor Caldee in honor of those who worked the fields. The cemetery dedication reads as follows:

Cemetery vandalism

In 2017, the cemetery was subject to vandalism with racial and derogatory marks made on the tombs. When the community members found out they participated in a candlelight vigil set up by Avondale City Councilman Lorenzo Sierra. One example of the vandalism that has taken place is the attempt to scratch the name of Jose M. Villela from the historic monument dedication.

Images

See also

 Litchfield Park, Arizona
 Goodyear, Arizona
 Avondale, Arizona
 Adamsville A.O.U.W. Cemetery
 Glendale Memorial Park Cemetery
 Pioneer and Military Memorial Park
 Double Butte Cemetery
 Home Mission Cemetery
 Greenwood/Memory Lawn Mortuary & Cemetery
 St. Francis Catholic Cemetery
 Historic Pinal Cemetery
 National Register of Historic Places listings in Maricopa County, Arizona

References

Further reading
 Litchfield Park by: Crouch, Celeste S.; Publisher: Arcadia Publishing; . 
 "Los Campos" (The Camps of Litchfield Park 1929–1986); by: Cruz Pariga Dominguez and Belen Soto Moreno; Publisher: Litchfield Park Historical Society;

External links
 "Pioneer Cemetery in Arizona Evokes Mexican Migrant Workers' Roots", Barriozona Magazine, April 10 2010
 

Cemeteries in Arizona